Hidden Fires is a lost 1918 silent film drama directed by George Irving and starring Mae Marsh and Rod La Rocque. It was produced and distributed by Goldwyn Pictures.

Cast
Mae Marsh - Peggy Murray/Louise Parke
Rod La Rocque - George Landis
Florida Kingsley - Mrs. Treadway Parke
Alec B. Francis - Dr. Granville
Jere Austin - Stephen Underwood

References

External links

1918 films
American silent feature films
Lost American films
American black-and-white films
Films directed by George Irving
Goldwyn Pictures films
Silent American drama films
1918 drama films
1918 lost films
Lost drama films
1910s American films
1910s English-language films